Streptomyces bauhiniae is a bacterium species from the genus of Streptomyces which has been isolated from the bark of the tree Bauhinia variegata from Thailand.

See also 
 List of Streptomyces species

References 

bauhiniae
Bacteria described in 2020